Scott VanSingel (born October 5, 1979) is an American politician who has served in the Michigan House of Representatives from the 100th district since 2017. On November 10, 2020, VanSingel tested positive for COVID-19.

References

1979 births
Living people
Republican Party members of the Michigan House of Representatives
People from Grand Rapids, Michigan
21st-century American politicians